Life's Shadows is a 1916 Dutch silent crime film directed by Theo Frenkel.

Cast
 Coen Hissink - Henri van Dijck
 Mary Beekman - Van Dijck's vrouw / Van Dijck's wife
 Cor Smits - Manager / Manager
 Tonny Stevens - Van Dijck's zoon / Van Dijck's zoon
 Balthazar Verhagen
 Herre de Vos
 Jan Wensma - Priester / Priest
 Willem Faassen - Jonge dief / Young thief
 Kees Lageman
 Piet Urban - Rechter / Judge
 Sylvain Poons - D van chique gezelschap bij aanhouding van een dievegge
 Annie Wesling
 Toon van Elsen
 Jacques Sluyters
 Jan Lemaire Sr.

External links 
 

1916 films
Dutch silent feature films
Dutch black-and-white films
Films directed by Theo Frenkel
Dutch crime films
1916 crime films